Brenessa Thompson (born 22 July 1996) is a Guyanese sprinter who specializes in 100m and 200m.

She represented Guyana in the 2014 World Junior Championships in Eugene, Oregon, where she made the semi finals in the 100m. She has a personal best in the 100m of 11.14 and holds the Guyanese record in the 200m with a time of 23.19.

References

External links 
 

1996 births
Living people
Guyanese female sprinters
Athletes (track and field) at the 2016 Summer Olympics
Olympic athletes of Guyana
Athletes (track and field) at the 2019 Pan American Games
Pan American Games competitors for Guyana
Olympic female sprinters